Jürg Weitnauer (born 14 February 1955) is a Swiss rower. He won the gold medal in the coxless four at the 1982 World Rowing Championships.

References 
 
 

1955 births
Living people
Swiss male rowers
Olympic rowers of Switzerland
Rowers at the 1976 Summer Olympics
Rowers at the 1980 Summer Olympics
Rowers at the 1984 Summer Olympics
Rowers at the 1988 Summer Olympics

World Rowing Championships medalists for Switzerland